Loups of Dalnigap is a waterfall of Scotland. It sits below Dalnigap House, in the South of the Lagafater Estate.

See also
Waterfalls of Scotland

References

Waterfalls of Scotland